This list of protected areas of Bornholm is a list of protected areas of Bornholm, Denmark.

List

See also

References

Protected areas
Protected areas of Denmark by municipality